MTB 102 is one of few surviving motor torpedo boats that served with the Coastal Forces of the Royal Navy in the Second World War. She was built as a prototype, but was purchased and taken into service by the Admiralty.

She was the smallest vessel to ever serve as a flagship for the Royal Navy.

Construction
Designed by Commander Peter Du Cane, the Managing Director of Vosper Ltd, in 1936. She was completed and launched in 1937, she was bought by the Admiralty and taken into service with the Royal Navy as MTB 102, the 100 prefix denoting a prototype vessel.

She had an all-wood hull, described as "double diagonal Honduras mahogany on Canadian rock elm".

Besides the torpedo tubes she was built with, depth charges, machine guns and the Swiss Oerlikon 20 mm anti-aircraft cannon were all tested on her.

MTB 102 was the fastest wartime British naval vessel in service at 48 knots.

Wartime service
From 1939 to 1940 she was stationed in the English Channel. During Operation Dynamo (the evacuation from Dunkirk, May–June 1940) she crossed the channel eight times and acted as flagship for Rear Admiral Wake-Walker when his flagship, destroyer , was disabled.

In 1943, she was part of 615 Water Transport Company RASC and was renamed Vimy.

In 1944, she carried Winston Churchill and General Dwight D. Eisenhower to review the fleet for Operation Overlord, the invasion of Normandy.

Postwar service
MTB 102 was sold off after the war, and converted to a private motor cruiser on the North Sea.

In April 1966 she was bought from Robinson's boatyard Oulton Broad by Mr Derek Brown from where she was berthed in a very unseaworthy condition and had been partially converted into a houseboat. Single-handedly Mr Brown completed extensive work and proceeded to launch MTB 102.

In 1973 she was acquired by the 1st Blofield and Brundall Sea Scouts, of Norfolk, in whose care she remained until 1995 when ownership passed to the MTB102 Trust. The vessel came with the purchase of the plot of land used as the group's water-base at Brundall Marina, on Hobros Dyke.

In 1976 she was refurbished by a film company for use in the film The Eagle Has Landed, and in the Dutch film Soldier of Orange the following year.

In 1977 she appeared for Queen Elizabeth II's Silver Jubilee pageant on the River Thames.

In 1983 and 1990 extensive structural repair work was carried out on the hull and decks totalling around £70,000.

Since 1979 she has made several appearances at Navy Days and is now listed as part of the National Historic Fleet.

The MTB 102 Trust was established in 1996 to fund the operation and maintenance of MTB 102; it is a registered charity under English law.

Several changes of engines have occurred over her life. The original Italian Isotta Fraschini engines became difficult to maintain during the early part of the war as Italy was allied to Germany, though they lasted until replaced after the war when MTB 102 was converted to civilian use. In 1985 Perkins Ltd donated two turbocharged diesel engines, and in 1996 and 2002 Cummins Marine provided new engines.

102 appeared as herself in the 2017 war film Dunkirk.

See also 
HMS Medusa (A353)

References

External links
 MTB 102 Trust website
 National Register of Historic Vessels
 British Military Powerboat Trust page

1937 ships
Motor torpedo boats of the Royal Navy
Patrol vessels of the United Kingdom
Ships and vessels of the National Historic Fleet
World War II British torpedo boats